Mick Dierdorff (born April 30, 1991) is an American snowboarder. He competed in the 2018 Winter Olympics and the 2022 Winter Olympics.

He participated at the FIS Freestyle Ski and Snowboarding World Championships 2019, winning a gold medal.

References

External links

1991 births
Living people
Snowboarders at the 2018 Winter Olympics
Snowboarders at the 2022 Winter Olympics
American male snowboarders
Olympic snowboarders of the United States
Sportspeople from Bellevue, Washington
Utah Utes athletes
21st-century American people